Daan is a Dutch masculine given name, short for Daniël. In the Netherlands, it has increased significantly in popularity as a birth name since 1970. People with the name include:

Daan Bekker (1932–2009), South African boxer
Daan den Bleijker (1928–2003), Dutch footballer
Daan Blij (born 1993), Dutch footballer
Daan Boerlage (born 1997), Dutch footballer
Daan Bovenberg (born 1988), Dutch footballer
Daan Brandenburg (born 1987), Dutch chess grandmaster
Daan Breeuwsma (born 1987), Dutch short-track speed skater
Daan Buijze (born 1928), Dutch swimmer
Daan van Bunge (born 1982), Dutch cricketer
Daan de Clercq (1854–1931), Dutch socialist and activist
Daan De Cooman (born 1974), Belgian judoka
Daan De Pever (born 1989), Belgian footballer
Daan van Dijk (1907–1986), Dutch track cyclist
Daan van Dinter (born 1989), Dutch footballer
Daan Disveld (born 1994), Dutch footballer
Daan Frenkel (born 1948), Dutch computational physicist
Daan van Gijseghem (born 1988), Belgian footballer
Daan van Golden (1936–2017), Dutch artist
Daan Goulooze (1901–1965), Dutch communist and World War II resistance fighter
Daan de Groot (1933–1982), Dutch cyclist
Daan van Haarlem (born 1989), Dutch volleyball player
Daan Heymans (born 1999), Belgian footballer
Daan Huiskamp (born 1985), Dutch footballer
Daan Huizing (born 1990), Dutch golfer
Daan Human (born 1976), South African rugby player
Daan Ibrahim (born 1995), Dutch footballer
Daan Janzing (born 1981), Dutch rock guitarist
Daan Jippes (born 1945), Dutch comics artists
Daan Kagchelland (1914–1998), Dutch Olympic sailor
Daan Klinkenberg (born 1996), Dutch footballer
Daan Klomp (born 1998), Dutch footballer
 (born 1966), Dutch cyclist
Daan Manneke (born 1939), Dutch composer and organist
Daan Mogot (1928–1946), Indonesian freedom fighter during World War II
Daan Myngheer (1993–2016), Belgian cyclist
Daan Nieber (born 1980), Dutch journalist
Daan Noppen (born 1977), Dutch draftsman and photographer
Daan Olivier (born 1992), Dutch cyclist
Daan Paau (born 1985), Dutch footballer
Daan Remmerts de Vries (born 1962), Dutch writer
Daan Rienstra (born 1992), Dutch footballer
Daan Romers (born 1985), Dutch DJ known as Dannic
Daan Roosegaarde (born 1979), Dutch installation artist
Daan Samson (born 1973), Dutch installation and performance artist
Daan Schuurmans (born 1972), Dutch movie actor
Daan Soete (born 1994), Dutch cyclo-cross cyclist
Daan Stuyven (born 1969), Flemish singer and guitarist
Daan Vaesen (born 1981), Belgian footballer
Daan Viljoen (1892–1972), South African Governor of South West Africa from 1953 to 1963
Daan Viljoen Game Reserve, named after him
Daan Zwierink (born 1998), Dutch pop singer

References

Dutch masculine given names